Neuhausen ob Eck is a town in the district of Tuttlingen in Baden-Württemberg in Germany.

Notable residents
 Bernd Luz, German contemporary visual artist.

References

External links
 Museum town

Tuttlingen (district)
Württemberg